Face It is an album by Dutch hard rock band Golden Earring, released in 1994. The album was not issued in the U.S.

Track listing
All songs written by Hay and Kooymans except where noted.

"Angel" – 3:41
"Hold Me Now" – 3:42
"Liquid Soul" – 4:06
"Minute by Minute" (Gerritsen) – 5:06
"Johnny Make Believe" – 4:44
"Space Ship" (Hay, Kooymans, E.H. Roelfzema) – 1:59
"The Unforgettable Dream" – 3:51
"I Can't Do Without Your Kiss" – 4:23
"Freedom Don't Last Forever" – 3:34
"Maximum Make-Up" (Hay, Kooymans, Roelfzema) – 4:40
"Legalize Telepathy" (Hay, Kooymans, Roelfzema) – 4:08

Personnel
Rinus Gerritsen - bass, guitar, harmonica, keyboard, vocals
Barry Hay - vocals, guitar
George Kooymans - guitar, vocals
Cesar Zuiderwijk - drums, percussion

Additional personnel
Ton Masseurs - Pedal Steel Guitar on track 8

Production
Producers: Rinus Gerritsen, Barry Hay, George Kooymans, John Sonneveld
Engineer: John Sonneveld
Mixing: John Sonneveld
Mastering: John Sonneveld

Charts

Weekly charts

Year-end charts

Certifications

References

Golden Earring albums
1994 albums
Columbia Records albums